Mohamed Salem Ould Béchir is a Mauritanian politician who served as Prime Minister of Mauritania from 2018 to 2019, following the resignation of his predecessor, Yahya Ould Hademine, and his government, in late October 2018.

Biography 

He studied robotics engineering in France. He began his career at the National Society of Water and Electricity (Sonelec) in September 1986. He was Secretary General of several ministries from May 2007 to September 2009, when he was appointed General Manager of the Mauritanian Electricity Company.

He stepped down in September 2013 when he joined the government as Minister of Water and Sanitation. In January 2015, he was appointed Minister of Petroleum, Energy and Mines, a position he held until 2016, when he was appointed Director of the National Society of Mining and Industry.

He is named Prime Minister after the resignation of Yahya Ould Hademine, several weeks after the triumph of the party in power, the party of the Union for the Republic, in the parliamentary elections of September 2018.

References

Living people
1962 births
Prime Ministers of Mauritania
Mauritanian Muslims
Energy ministers of Mauritania
Mining ministers of Mauritania
Oil ministers of Mauritania
Water ministers of Mauritania